The Saint of Gamblers (賭聖２之街頭賭聖) is a 1995 Hong Kong film directed by Wong Jing. It is a spin-off of the All for the Winner series, with only Ng Man Tat reprising his role.

Cast
 Natalis Chan - Announcer
 John Ching - Tung
 Eric Kot - God Bless You
 Chingmy Yau - Yuen Fan
 Donnie Yen - Lone Seven
 Ashton Chen - Siu-Loong
 Ng Man-tat - Uncle Tat
 Ben Lam - Ray Thai
 Andy Cheng - Ray's Thug
 Lee Tat Chiu - Ray's Thug
 Lai Sing Kwong - Ray's thug
 Fung Wai Lun - Ray's Thug
 Jack Wong - Ray's Thug
 Mai Wai Cheung - Ray's Thug
 Adam Chan - Ray's Thug
 Chan Siu Wah - Ray's Thug
 Diana Pang - Hokei
 Shing Fui-On - Assassin
 William Tuen - Japanese gambler
 Manfred Wong - Dwarf
 Corey Yuen - Mahjong player

References

External links
 

1995 films
Hong Kong action comedy films
Films directed by Wong Jing
1990s Hong Kong films